The 2020 FC Tobol season was the 22nd successive season that the club will play in the Kazakhstan Premier League, the highest tier of association football in Kazakhstan. Tobol will also play in the Kazakhstan Cup and the Europa League.

Season Events
On 14 December 2019, Grigori Babayan was announced as Tobol's new head coach.

On 7 February, Tobol announced the signing of Roman Murtazayev on a one-year contract.

On 12 February, Tobol announced the signing of Arman Hovhannisyan from Gandzasar Kapan.

On 17 February, Tobol announced the signing of Aleksa Amanović on a one-year contract, with the option of an additional year.

On 19 February, Tobol announced the signing of Luka Zarandia on loan from Zulte Waregem until 31 July.

On 22 February, Tobol announced the signing of Aleksandr Mokin on a one-year contract.

On 13 March, the Football Federation of Kazakhstan announced all league fixtures would be played behind closed doors for the foreseeable future due to the COVID-19 pandemic. On 16 March the Football Federation of Kazakhstan suspended all football until 15 April.

On 4 April 2020, Maxim Fedin joined FC Kaisar on loan for the remainder of the 2020 season.

On 8 July, Tobol announced the signings of Serhiy Malyi from Astana and Carlos Fonseca from Irtysh Pavlodar.

On 26 June, it was announced that the league would resume on 1 July, with no fans being permitted to watch the games. The league was suspended for a second time on 3 July, for an initial two weeks, due to an increase in COVID-19 cases in the country.

On 27 July, Stephen Eze's contract with Tobol was ended by mutual consent, and Luka Zarandia loan deal from Zulte Waregem expired.

On 4 August, Tobol announced the signing of Jérémy Manzorro from Shakhter Karagandy.

New Contracts
On 12 January, Dmitri Miroshnichenko signed a new contract with Tobol until the end of 2020.

On 25 February, midfielder Daniyar Semchenkov extended his contract with Tobol until the end of 2020, whilst defender Roman Asrankulov also extended his contract until the end of 2020.

Squad

On loan

Transfers

In

Loans in

Loans out

Released

Friendlies

Competitions

Premier League

Results summary

Results by round

Results

League table

Kazakhstan Cup

Squad statistics

Appearances and goals

|-
|colspan="14"|Players away from Tobol on loan:
|-
|colspan="14"|Players who left Tobol during the season:

|}

Goal scorers

Clean sheet

Disciplinary record

References

External links
Official Website

FC Tobol seasons
Tobol